Roscello Rudelizio Vlijter (born 1 January 2000) is a Surinamese international footballer who plays as a midfielder for Cypriot Second Division club Peyia 2014.

Club career

Telstar
A product of the Feyenoord youth academy, Vlijter signed his first professional contract with Eerste Divisie club Telstar in June 2019. After having his passport stolen while on international duties, Vlijter could not return to the Netherlands to play for Telstar between September and October 2019. Partly due to missing practice and struggling to regain form, he did not make an appearance in his first season with the club.

On 11 December 2020, Vlijter made his professional debut, coming off the bench for the injured Siebe Vandermeulen in the 18th minute of a 3–2 loss to Almere City.

Career statistics

Club

Notes

International

Honours

Feyenoord U19
 Dutch Youth Cup U19: 2017–18

References

2000 births
Living people
Surinamese footballers
Surinamese expatriate footballers
Suriname international footballers
Association football forwards
S.V. Robinhood players
Feyenoord players
SC Telstar players
Sportspeople from Paramaribo
Surinamese expatriate sportspeople in the Netherlands
Expatriate footballers in the Netherlands
Surinamese expatriate sportspeople in Cyprus
Expatriate footballers in Cyprus
Suriname youth international footballers
Suriname under-20 international footballers